John Paul Durnin (born 18 August 1965) is an English former footballer who scored 100 goals in 475 league appearances over a career spanning close to two decades.

He began his career at Liverpool in 1986, but made just three minor cup appearances for the first team before he was allowed to join Oxford United for a £225,000 fee in February 1989, having previously gained experience on loan at West Bromwich Albion. He spent four years with Oxford, playing close to 200 games, before he was sold on to Portsmouth for £200,000 in 1993. In six years with "Pompey" he made around 200 appearances, before he was loaned out to Blackpool, and then allowed to leave permanently for Carlisle United in 1999. In 2000, he signed with Kidderminster Harriers, before he briefly entered the Welsh football circuit with Rhyl in 2001. Later that year he returned to the Football League with Port Vale, before he joined Conference side Accrington Stanley for a twelve-month spell in May 2003.

Playing career
Durnin's career began with Liverpool in 1986, when he was signed from local non-league side Waterloo Dock for £500. Able to play in midfield or up front, he was a regular in the Liverpool Reserves but failed to break into the first team, making only two appearances, both in the League Cup. In October 1988 he was loaned out to West Bromwich Albion, as one of Brian Talbot's first signings at The Hawthorns. He scored twice in five Second Division appearances before returning to Anfield. He moved to Oxford United in February 1989, after manager Brian Horton paid a fee of £225,000. The "Yellows" finished 17th in the Second Division in 1988–89 and 1989–90, with Durnin finishing as the club's top scorer in the latter campaign with 15 goals. They rose to 10th in 1990–91, only to plummet to one place and two points above the relegation zone in 1991–92. They rose to 14th in 1992–93. Durnin spent four and a half years at the Manor Ground, amassing 47 goals in 180 league and cup appearances, becoming a cult hero amongst the fans, who affectionately gave him the nickname "Johnny Lager".

Durnin was snapped up by Portsmouth for £200,000 in July 1993, with manager Jim Smith looking to play up him front alongside Paul Walsh. The club finished 17th in the First Division in 1993–94 and 18th in 1994–95. He hit three goals in 1995–96, as "Pompey" avoided the drop after finishing one place ahead of relegated Millwall on goal difference. He scored three times in 35 games in 1996–97, as Terry Fenwick led the club to 7th place, one place and three points behind Crystal Palace in the final play-off place. The Fratton Park faithful witnessed another relegation scrap in 1997–98, as "Pompey" finished two places and one point ahead of relegated Manchester City; Durnin scored ten goals in 35 appearances during the campaign. He scored seven goals in 30 appearances in 1998–99, as Alan Ball led the club to 19th, ahead of relegated Bury on goals scored. Durnin lost his first team place at the start of the 1999–2000 campaign after he dislocated an elbow by crashing a golf cart into a fairway hollow. He was loaned out to Second Division Blackpool in November 1999, and scored twice in six games for Nigel Worthington's "Tangerines" with strikes against Wigan Athletic in the league and Hendon in the FA Cup. He joined Carlisle United on loan the following month, and signed a permanent deal at Brunton Park in February 2000. He played 23 times for the "Cumbrians" in 1999–2000 as the club finished second-from-bottom in the Third Division under Martin Wilkinson, avoiding relegation into the Conference only due to their superior goal difference to Chester City.

Durnin was without a club until he signed with Football League newcomers Kidderminster Harriers in October 2000, after being signed by former Liverpool teammate Jan Mølby. He hit nine goals in 32 games in 2000–01, before leaving Aggborough in the summer. He joined League of Wales side Rhyl as player-coach in July 2001. He returned to the Second Division in December 2001, linking up with his former manager Brian Horton at Port Vale. He stayed at Vale Park for eighteen months, also helping out in a coaching capacity, before he left in May 2003. Despite being the wrong side of 36, he still managed to play 19 games in 2001–02 and 31 games in 2002–03, scoring once in each campaign. Now aged 38, he signed a deal with Conference side Accrington Stanley, and scored four goals in 15 games before he retired in 2004.

Coaching career
In July 2006, he joined the coaching staff of Southport, but left in October of that year. He returned to Southport as first team coach on a non-contract basis in May 2017, before this arrangement was ended three months later.

Personal life
After retiring, he became a regular for the Liverpool Masters team. In 2019 he was convicted of common assault, impersonating a police officer and a racially-aggravated common assault after two incidents in August 2018 – in mitigation he claimed to have been 'emotionally unstable' after discovering his wife of three decades had cheated on him; he had another previous conviction for common assault after a road rage incident in 2015.

Career statistics
Source:

References

1965 births
Living people
Sportspeople from Bootle
English footballers
Association football forwards
Association football midfielders
Waterloo Dock A.F.C. players
Liverpool F.C. players
West Bromwich Albion F.C. players
Oxford United F.C. players
Portsmouth F.C. players
Blackpool F.C. players
Carlisle United F.C. players
Kidderminster Harriers F.C. players
Rhyl F.C. players
Port Vale F.C. players
Accrington Stanley F.C. players
English Football League players
Cymru Premier players
National League (English football) players
Association football coaches
English people convicted of assault